Vanna was an American hardcore punk band from Boston that was formed in 2004. On December 15, 2017, the band played their final show at the Worcester Palladium.

The band's sound has been described as furious and cathartic, changing over time from screamo to metalcore to post-hardcore, with some songs showing emo or melodic metalcore elements.

History

Early years (2004–2005) 
The band formed in December 2004 by guitarists Nicholas Lambert and Evan Pharmakis. The duo recorded their first demo in Lambert's dorm room at MassArt, using the program Reason for drums. Soon after, they recruited drummer Brandon Davis (who at the time was playing guitar for the band Therefore I Am), bassist Shawn Marquis, and vocalist Joe Bragel. They then recorded and self-released their first EP entitled This Will Be Our Little Secret. The five song EP helped the band gain a strong local fan base. It was this EP that got them noticed to the record companies, and on November 15, 2005, the band was signed to Epitaph Records.

Epitaph Records (2005–2009) 
In March 2006 they released a split 7-inch vinyl with Therefore I Am, of which only 500 hand numbered copies were pressed (100 pink colored vinyl, 100 blue and 300 white). They then began recording their third EP and first release with Epitaph Records, The Search Party Never Came in February 2006. During the recording process, Vanna decided to part ways with original vocalist Joe Bragel. Nick Lambert filled in and took over on vocals for the recording of that album. After the release of the record in June 2006, they recruited Chris Preece as vocalist.

The band toured the second half of 2006, and on October 25, 2006, they traveled to Seattle, Washington to record their first full-length album with producer Matt Bayles (Mastodon, Norma Jean, the Fall of Troy, Pearl Jam). They recorded until December 19, 2006. In February 2007 the band began touring again with the Esoteric and played a few dates on the 2007 Epitaph Tour. Their first full-length debut album, Curses was released on April 24, 2007.

On February 15, 2008, drummer Brandon Davis played his last show as a member of Vanna and parted ways with the band during a tour with Knives Exchanging Hands and My Hero Is Me. The band finished up the tour with Ryan Seaman on drums. As the band began writing their second full-length, they recruited Chris Campbell as full-time drummer. Campbell joined Vanna from the New Hampshire-based band the Jonah Veil, who were disbanding. Campbell's first concert with Vanna was at The Living Room in Providence, Rhode Island, on March 22, 2008.

Vanna's next album titled A New Hope was released on March 24, 2009. A New Hope reached No. 31 on the Billboard Heatseekers chart. AllMusic described the first track as a "stuttering hardcore breakdown blast" setting the tone for the rest of the album's "uplift and crushing heaviness"; something that screamo bands had been trying to accomplish.

In July 2009, vocalist Chris Preece left the band on good terms, citing "personal reasons". Following the band's summer 2009 tour with A Static Lullaby, Preece was replaced by Davey Muise of Seeker Destroyer. Preece played his last show with Vanna at the Mansfield, Massachusetts, stop of the 2009 Warped Tour where Muise was brought to the stage and introduced. Muise played his first official show with Vanna on Saturday July 25, 2009, at the Palladium in Worcester, Massachusetts.

Artery Recordings and departure of Evan Pharmakis (2010–2013) 
Epitaph dropped the band from their roster, so in August 2010, Vanna announced their signing to Artery Recordings. Their debut release through the label was an EP titled The Honest Hearts with producer Jay Maas, released on October 12, 2010. Vanna released the single "Passerby" from the EP and a rerecording of "Trashmouth" as well as "Dead Language For A Dying Lady" with Davey Muise. On January 2, 2011, the band confirmed that they were going to Glow in the Dark Studios to record the new full-length album titled And They Came Baring Bones with producer Matt Goldman. The album was released on June 21, 2011. AllMusic described the album as a continuation of previous work, with some familiar melodic metalcore-style songs, and much the same singing from Muise as had been heard from Preece. The band still delivered vocals that were alternately "Cookie Monster rough and emo clean", with lead vocals coming from guitarist Pharmakis on some songs.

On February 2, 2012, the band announced that founding member guitarist/vocalist Evan Pharmakis and drummer Chris Campbell had quit the band due to family and financial issues. Pharmakis formed a solo project, Wind in Sails. The band also announced on the same day that they recruited guitarist Joel Pastuszak to the band's lineup. Vanna was featured on the Warped Tour 2012.

After touring with several fill-in drummers, Vanna settled on drummer Eric Gross to record next album, again with producer Jay Maas. On March 19, 2013, the band released their new full-length record, The Few and the Far Between, touring in support of the release through 2013 and into 2014. The band promoted and supported the album by uploading video clips through their YouTube account from August to October 2013.

In November 2013, the band recorded a couple of new songs and announced that they would be self-releasing a 7-inch titled Preying/Purging on December 17.

Pure Noise Records (2014–present) 
In February 2014, the band announced they had signed with Pure Noise Records and that they would play on the 2014 Vans Warped Tour. Vanna started recording a new album with producer Will Putney (Like Moths to Flames, Texas in July, Stray from the Path).

On April 18, 2014, the band announced that their fifth album would be titled Void, and would be released on June 16, 2014, through Pure Noise Records. The band's style had changed from screamo to metalcore, supported by Patuszak's clean vocals and Muise's screaming vocals. AllMusic described the band as a "punk-metal hybrid", delivering an album that was "furious, punishing, and relentlessly hateful..." In August it was announced that the band, along with bands Sirens & Sailors, Sylar and Alive Like Me, would be supporting Beartooth on their first North America tour throughout October.

On October 2, 2015, they released an EP titled ALT, consisting of five cover songs.

On May 19, 2016, Vanna released a video for the first single off their new LP, All Hell, titled Pretty Grim, while additionally announcing that All Hell would be released July 8, 2016. Two more singles were released: "Mutter" on June 9, 2016, and "Leather Feather" on June 23. AllMusic reviewed All Hell, calling Vanna a "post-hardcore unit" delivering an album full of cathartic fury.

On April 28, 2017, the band confirmed dates of a tour titled 'All Good Things Must Come To An End' as "a farewell with our friends", confirming their forthcoming plans to part ways. Pastuszak elected to not participate in the band's final shows. In Summer 2017, the band announced their farewell performance with support from Eighteen Visions, Knocked Loose, Bad Rabbits (later to be replaced by END), On Broken Wings, Like Pacific, Kublai Khan, Lions Lions, Old Wounds, Sharptooth, and Roseview. The final Vanna show took place December 15, 2017, at the Worcester Palladium in Worcester, Massachusetts. Past members of Vanna Joe Bragel, Evan Pharmakis, Chris Preece, Brandon Davis and Eric Gross all took part in the concert.

On October 1, 2020, Nicholas Lambert announced via Reddit and Instagram that five of the original members Nicholas, Brandon, Shawn, Evan, and Chris had come back together to form a new band under the name INSPIRIT. When asked about the direction of the band Lambert stated, "we wanted to do something that fit into that sound we were doing back in 2006, but just done smarter and with better production."

Band members 

Final Line-up
Davey Muise – lead vocals  (2009–2017)
Nicholas Lambert – guitar, vocals (2004–2017)
Shawn Marquis – bass, vocals (2005–2017)
Seamus Menihane – drums, percussion (2015–2017)

Touring
Casey Aylward – guitar, vocals (2017)
Nick Casaletto- Vocals (2006–2007)

Former
Joe Bragel – vocals (2005–2006)
Joel Pastuszak – guitar, programming, keyboard, vocals (2012–2017)
Brandon Davis – drums (2005–2008)
Chris Preece – vocals (2006–2009)
Chris Campbell – drums  (2008–2012)
Evan Pharmakis – guitar, vocals, keyboard, programming  (2004–2012)
Eric "Rabbit" Gross – drums  (2012–2015)

Timeline

Discography

Studio albums

EPs

Compilation albums featured on

References

External links 

Musical groups from Boston
Metalcore musical groups from Massachusetts
Epitaph Records artists
Musical groups established in 2004
Musical groups disestablished in 2017
American post-hardcore musical groups
Pure Noise Records artists